NGC 7046 is a barred spiral galaxy located 193 million light-years away in the constellation of Equuleus. With a high radial velocity of 4,130 km/s, the galaxy is drifting away from the Milky Way. NGC 7046 has an apparent size of 0.990 arcmin, and at its current distance, it has an estimate diameter of 192,639 light years. NGC 7046 has a morphological type of "SBc", which indicates that it is a barred spiral galaxy with a definite bulge.

As of 2021, there have been no observed supernovas in the galaxy, but it has been discovered to be in a small galaxy group.

See also 
 NGC 7025

References

External links 

Barred spiral galaxies
LINER galaxies
Equuleus
7046
11708
66407
Astronomical objects discovered in 1790